Dębiny  (Dubyny) is a village in the administrative district of Gmina Narol, within Lubaczów County, Subcarpathian Voivodeship, in south-eastern Poland.

In 2005 the village had a population of 230.

References

Villages in Lubaczów County